Bragança, Pará is a municipality in the state of Pará in the Northern region of Brazil.

The municipality contains part of the  Tracuateua Marine Extractive Reserve, a sustainable use conservation unit created in 2005.
It contains the  Caeté-Taperaçu Marine Extractive Reserve, created in 2005.

History
The city was founded as New Bragança (after Bragança, Portugal).

See also
List of municipalities in Pará

References

Municipalities in Pará
Populated coastal places in Pará